Flynn Clarke (born 19 December 2002) is a professional footballer who plays as a midfielder for EFL Championship club Norwich City.

Career
Clarke joined the Peterborough United academy at the age of 9. The midfielder featured for a Posh XI in a pre-season friendly against Deeping Rangers in July 2019, before making the bench in EFL Cup ties against both Northampton Town and Arsenal U21s. He went on to sign his first professional contract on his seventeenth birthday, with manager Darren Ferguson stating Clarke "was someone that [he] really liked. He plays as a 10 predominantly, is a good size, an athlete and can get you a goal." He made his first team debut in a 1-0 loss to Cheltenham Town in the first round of the EFL Cup in September 2020. In his second appearance for Peterborough, an EFL Trophy tie against Burton Albion, he scored his first goal for the club. His league debut came in Peterborough's opening game against Accrington Stanley in September 2020.

He was selected for the Scotland under-19 squad in October 2020.

On 24 June 2021, Clarke signed for Norwich City for an undisclosed fee. Clarke went into the Norwich City under-23s team for the 2021/22 season and impressed in the Premier League 2 scoring twice in the opening 10 games from central midfield. He also netted twice in a 3-1 win over Reading in the Premier League Cup in January 2022.

Career statistics

Notes

References 

2002 births
Living people
People from Cambridgeshire
English footballers
Scottish footballers
Scotland youth international footballers
Association football midfielders
Peterborough United F.C. players
Norwich City F.C. players
English Football League players
English people of Scottish descent
Scotland under-21 international footballers